Halicampus dunckeri or also commonly known as the Duncker's pipefish  or ridgenose pipefish is a species of fish in the family Syngnathidae.

Description
The Duncker's pipefish is a small sized fish that can reach a maximum length of 15 cm. It has a thin and elongate body with reduced fins which are difficult to observe. The body color is highly variable from one individual to another ranging from creamy white to dark brown through redish to yellowish.
The dorsal part of the body is full of small whitish skin growths as well as irregular pale bars.
Its head is rather small with large eyes, the snout is short with a characteristic whitish part at its tip.

Distribution
The ridgenose pipefish is widespread throughout the tropical and subtropical waters of the Indo-West Pacific from the eastern coast of Africa, Red Sea included, until Salomon Islands and from South Japan to the Great Barrier Reef.

The ridgenose pipefish is found close to the bottom between the surface and 25 meters deep.

It prefers areas such as reef, sandy bottom or coral rubble with algae or debris in which it can easily hide.

Biology

Like many of their congeners belonging to the family of Pipefishes, the Duncker's pipefish has a benthic lifestyle and is ovoviviparous.

Its reproduction occurs during a courtship where the female will transfer her eggs in the ventral surface of the male between skin folds forming a kind of protective pouch in which he will fertilize them and protect them during the incubation period.

The Duncker's pipefish is a carnivore. Its diet is based on small crustaceans and other invertebrates which it aspires through its tubular snout.

Etymlogy
The fish is named  in honor of ichthyologist Georg Duncker (1870-1953), of the Zoological Museum Hamburg, who revised the pipefish family in 1915.

References

External links
http://www.marinespecies.org/aphia.php?p=taxdetails&id=218013
http://www.fishbase.org/summary/5974
http://www.eol.org/pages/204530/details
http://www.itis.gov/servlet/SingleRpt/SingleRpt?search_topic=TSN&search_value=644994

dunckeri
Taxa named by Paul Chabanaud
Fish described in 1929